The Communal Experience: Anarchist and Mystical Counter-Cultures in America is a book-length historical and sociological study of cultural radicalism in the United States, written by historian Laurence Veysey and published in 1973 by Harper & Row.

Further reading

External links 

 
 

1973 non-fiction books
Books about anarchism
English-language books
History books about the United States
American non-fiction books
Harper & Row books
Ferrer Center and Colony